Källström is a Swedish surname, simplified Kallstrom. Notable people with the surname include:

 Kim Källström (born 1982), Swedish footballer
 Harry Källström (1939–2009), Swedish professional rally driver
 James Kallstrom (1943–2021), American Federal Bureau of Investigation (FBI) agent

See also
 Marjo Matikainen-Kallström (born 1965), former Finnish cross-country skier

Swedish-language surnames